Doctor of Letters (D.Litt., Litt.D., Latin:  or ) is a terminal degree in the humanities that, depending on the country, is a higher doctorate after the Doctor of Philosophy (Ph.D.) degree or equivalent to a higher doctorate, such as the Doctor of Science (Sc.D. or D.Sc.). It is awarded in many countries by universities and learned bodies in recognition of superior accomplishment in the humanities, original contributions to the creative or cultural arts, or scholarship and other merits. It may be conferred as an earned degree upon the completion of a regular doctoral course of study, usually including the development and defense of an original dissertation, or may be conferred as an earned higher doctorate after the submission and academic evaluation of a portfolio of sustained scholarship, publications, research, or other scientific work of the highest caliber.

In addition to being awarded as an earned degree, this doctorate is also widely conferred honoris causa to recognize one's lifetime of excellence in a particular humanistic, cultural, or artistic field, or other notable contributions to society. When conferred as an honorary doctorate, many or all of the standard degree requirements, including application, matriculation, coursework, doctoral dissertation or thesis, and portfolio evaluation may be waived, at the discretion of the degree-granting body. Honorary Doctor of Letters recipients do not necessarily have any previous affiliation with the awarding institution and, in most cases, it is not considered proper for them to use the title of "Dr." before their names. Universities, colleges, or learned bodies may award the honorary degree of Doctor of Letters, or the related Doctor of Humane Letters, to luminaries who have been identified as rare exemplars who have enriched the humanities in particular, or humanity at large. Mark Twain was awarded an honorary D.Litt. by Oxford University in 1907 for his literary contributions. Nelson Mandela was awarded honorary Doctor of Letters degrees by the University of Natal in 1993 and the Open University of Tanzania in 2000 for his leadership in the struggle against apartheid in South Africa.

Britain, the Commonwealth and the Republic of Ireland

In the United Kingdom, Australia, India, and Ireland, the degree is a higher doctorate, above the Doctor of Philosophy (Ph.D.) or Doctor of Education (Ed.D.), for example, and is awarded on the basis of high achievement in the respective field or a long record of research and publication. The D.Litt. degree is awarded to candidates whose record of published work and research shows conspicuous ability and originality and constitutes a distinguished and sustained achievement. University committee and board approval is required, and candidates must provide documented mastery of a particular area or field. The degree may also be awarded honoris causa to such individuals as the awarding institution deems worthy of this highest academic award.

At the University of Oxford, the degree was established in 1900 as part of the development of graduate-level research degrees that began with the introduction of the B.Litt. and B.Sc. degrees in 1895. Until then, Oxford had focused on undergraduate teaching, with the doctorates, such as those in divinity (D.D.) and medicine (D.M.) traditionally reserved for established scholars. The German paradigm, adopted by the Americans, that created a demand for the philosophiae doctor (Ph.D.) degree as a basic qualification for an academic career, was not immediately adopted at Oxford, but it did create pressure for Oxford to offer a degree for this purpose. Rather than use the D.Litt. degree, Oxford eventually created its doctor of philosophy (D.Phil.) degree in 1915, deliberately using a distinctive English, rather than a Latin, title and abbreviation for it. The D.Phil. became an accelerated, supervised, degree of lower status than the D.Litt. When it was established in 1900, the Oxford Doctor of Literature (D.Litt.) degree could be awarded to individuals who had a standing of thirty-four terms from the award of a B.Litt. degree, or of thirty-nine terms (thirteen academic years) from the award of an Oxford master of arts M.A. degree, providing they could provide "fitness for the degree in published books or papers, containing an original contribution to the advancement of learning." The required number of terms changed over the years, depending on the prior Oxford degree that a candidate held, and the requirements became more specific.

By 2015, The Oxford University Examination Regulations called for a faculty board at Oxford to "appoint judges to consider the evidence submitted by any candidate, and to report thereon to the board. In making their report, the judges shall state whether the evidence submitted constitutes an original contribution to the advancement of knowledge of such substance and distinction as to give the candidate an authoritative status in some branch or branches of learning." Between 1923 and 2016, Oxford awarded 219 D.Litt. degrees, of which 196 were awarded to men and 23 to women. Among the six higher doctoral degrees at Oxford (D.D., D.M., D.C.L., D.Litt., D.Sc., D.Mus.), the D.Litt. comprised 27.5% of the higher doctorates awarded during this 93-year period.

In June 2016, the Oxford D.Litt. was suspended, pending a reform of the higher doctorates. The reforms were completed in June 2018 and applications reopened in September 2018. The new regulations reduced the number of higher doctorates to five by dropping the Doctor of Medicine as a higher doctorate. The standards for the remaining doctorates, including the D.Litt. (now also referred to as "Doctor of Letters" rather than Doctor of Literature), require the judges "to consider whether the evidence submitted demonstrates excellence in academic scholarship and is:
 a)	of the absolute highest quality;
 b)	substantial in scale and in the contribution it has made to knowledge;
 c)	sustained over time and showing current and continued contribution to scholarship;
 d)	authoritative, being able to demonstrate impact on the work of others;
 e)	of global reach and international importance within the field; and
 f)	of such breadth or covering such branches of knowledge appropriate to the field and in line with disciplinary norms and expectations."

United States
In the United States, the degree may be conferred as an honorary degree or an earned degree.

Numerous American universities regularly award the honorary Doctor of Letters (D.Litt.) degree, including Harvard University, Columbia University, and Yale University, among others.

At Drew University, the earned Doctor of Letters (D.Litt.) program requires the completion of 45 graduate credit hours beyond the master's degree, including the successful development and defense of a 150–220 page doctoral dissertation.

France
In France, the doctorat is awarded with a speciality, but there is no official list of these. Candidates for a doctorat in literature are awarded a Doctorat ès lettres, abbreviated Dr ès l.

There is a higher degree, the Habilitation à diriger des recherches, which is obtained following different rules in each field. In literature, the candidates must also present a new and unpublished work. The habilitation (which is not followed by an indication of the field) allows holders to apply for a position of professor in French universities.

Before the 1950s, the now-abolished Doctorat d'État degree was called Doctorat ès lettres (in France, "letters" is equivalent to "humanities").

India

Mahakavi is the highest literary honour in India for published works in literature.

The highest educational attainment at Sanskrit Colleges in India is the Vidya Vachaspati, legally recognized as the equivalent to the Western D.Litt. Enrollment in a Vidya Vachaspati program generally requires both having published works and the previous attainment of a Vidya Vairidhi degree, equivalent to a PhD.

References

Literature
Higher doctorates